This is a list of post-nominal letters used in Terengganu. The order in which they follow an individual's name is the same as the order of precedence for the wearing of order insignias, decorations, and medals. When applicable, non-hereditary titles are indicated.

See also 
 Orders, decorations, and medals of Terengganu
 Order of precedence in Terengganu

References 

Post
T